Ilsley is both a surname and a given name. Notable people with the name include:

Surname:
Blaise Ilsley (born 1964), American baseball coach and pitcher
Daniel Ilsley (1740–1813), American politician (Representative from Massachusetts)
Edward Ilsley (1838–1926), British Roman Catholic Archbishop of Birmingham, England
Harry P. Ilsley (1884-1953), American judge
George K. Ilsley (born 1958), Canadian writer of gay literature
James Lorimer Ilsley (1894–1967), Canadian politician

Given name:
Ilsley Boone (1879–1968), promoter of nudism in the USA